, is a male Japanese judoka.

His father is an American. His parents divorced when he was little and was raised by his mother.

He started judo at the age of 7. His favorite technique is Ouchi Gari. In 2015, he won the bronze medal in the Middleweight (90 kg) division at the 2015 World Judo Championships. He is currently ranked No. 38 in the world (as of 2019). He won the gold medal in under 90 kg division in 2016 Rio Olympics.

Competitive record

(as of 4 December 2015)

References

External links

 
 
 
 

1994 births
Living people
Japanese male judoka
Tokai University alumni
Judoka at the 2016 Summer Olympics
Olympic judoka of Japan
Olympic gold medalists for Japan
Olympic medalists in judo
Medalists at the 2016 Summer Olympics
Japanese people of American descent
Judoka at the 2018 Asian Games
Asian Games gold medalists for Japan
Asian Games bronze medalists for Japan
Asian Games medalists in judo
Medalists at the 2018 Asian Games